Robert Ellis (September 24, 1933 – November 23, 1973) was an American film and television actor in the 1940s and 1950s, who was the last actor to play Henry Aldrich on the radio series The Aldrich Family.

Early life
Robert Ellis was born in Chicago, Illinois to Fern Bloomfield. He was educated in professional children's schools in New York City and Hollywood and later studied theater arts at Columbia University.

Career
He made his acting debut at age 5 and appeared in some 50 movies and television shows, sometimes billed as "Bobby Ellis." In 1948, the Academy of Motion Pictures Arts and Sciences awarded him a special certificate for his acting and dancing role as Buster Tyme in the movie April Showers, which starred Ann Sothern and Jack Carson.  He portrayed Ralph Grainger, a college friend of Ronnie Burns, on the final two seasons of The George Burns and Gracie Allen Show.

He died of kidney failure at the age of 40 in Los Angeles. At the time of his death, he was a producer of educational films.

Filmography

April Showers (1948) as Buster Tyme
The Babe Ruth Story (1948) as George Herman Ruth as a Boy
Mexican Hayride (1948) as Mexican Boy (uncredited)
The Green Promise (1949) as Buzz Wexford
El Paso (1949) as Jack Elkins
Easy Living (1949) as Urchin
A Kiss for Corliss (1949) as Raymond Pringle
Walk Softly, Stranger (1950) as Skating Boy
Call Me Mister (1951) as Ack-Ack Ackerman
The Guest (1951) film short
Retreat, Hell! (1952) as Shorty Devine 
Peter Pan (1953) as Lost Boy (voice, uncredited)
Niagara (1953) as Young Man (uncredited) 
Prisoner of War (1954) as Alan H. Rolfe (uncredited)
The Long Gray Line (1955) as Cadet Short (uncredited)
The McConnell Story (1955) as Bob Brown
Tea and Sympathy (1956) as Second Boy (uncredited)
Pillars of the Sky (1956) as Albie
Space Master X-7 (1958) as Pvt. Joe Rattigan
Gidget (1959) as Hot Shot
Don't Give Up the Ship (1959) as Sailor (uncredited)
Wake Me When It's Over (1960) as Corporal (uncredited)

Television roles

The Aldrich Family (1952-1953) as Henry Aldrich 
Meet Corliss Archer (1951 & 1954-1955) as Dexter Franklin
I Love Lucy (1952) as Tommy the Office Boy
Fireside Theatre (1951-1952)
Big Town (1952)
Where's Raymond? (1954)
Schlitz Playhouse (1954)
The Loretta Young Show (1954) as Tom
Public Defender (1954) as Johnny Wagner
The Lone Ranger (1955) as Jack 'Kid' Hall
Cavalcade of America (1955)
Meet Corliss Archer (1954-1955) as Dexter Franklin
The Bob Cummings Show (1956) as Joe Depew
Telephone Time (1956)
Lux Video Theatre (1956)
The Adventures of Jim Bowie (1956) as Pat Jordan
The Joseph Cotten Show: On Trial (1956) as George Barnett
The Life and Legend of Wyatt Earp (1957) as Pvt. Crenshaw
Jane Wyman Presents The Fireside Theatre (1957)
Navy Log (1957) as Kupper
The Sheriff of Cochise (1957) as Jaekel
Alfred Hitchcock Presents (1957) as Reporter / Tommy Kopeck
Code 3 (1957) as Dewey Cushmnan / Fred Bacon
General Electric Theater (1957)
The George Burns and Gracie Allen Show (1956-1958) series regular
Flight (1958)
77 Sunset Strip (1958) as Harry Warren
Death Valley Days (1959) as Ben (in "Wheelbarrow Johnny")
The Real McCoys (1959) as Gas Station Customer
The Donna Reed Show (1959) as Young Man (in "The Punishment")
M Squad (1960)as Tom Herrick (in "Dead Parrots Don't Talk")
Tallahassee 7000 (1961)
The Jackie Gleason Special (1973)

References

External links

 

1933 births
1973 deaths
Male actors from Chicago
American male child actors
American male radio actors
American male stage actors
American male television actors
American male film actors
Columbia University School of the Arts alumni
Deaths from kidney failure
20th-century American male actors